This is a list of cities and towns in the Central African Republic.

Alindao
Baboua
Bahamo
Bambari
Bangassou
Bangui
Baoro
Batangafo
Berbérati
Bimbo
Birao
Boali
Bobangui
Boda
Bossangoa
Bossembélé
Bouar
Bouca
Bozoum
Bria
Carnot
Damara
Gambo
Gamboula
Guen
Ippy
Kabo
Kaga-Bandoro
Kembé
Kouango
Mbaïki
Mobaye
Mongoumba
N'Délé
Nola
Obo
Ouadda
Ouango
Paoua
Rafaï
Sibut
Zinga

Largest cities

References 

Central African Republic, List of cities in the
 
Central African
Cities

simple:Central African Republic#Cities